{{Infobox television
 | runtime        = 22 min (per episode)
 | creator        = Unknown
 | starring       = Linda Liao Utt Panichkul  Max Loong Joanne Peh | country        = Singapore
 | network        = MediaCorp Channel 5
 | first_aired    = 
 | last_aired     = 
 | num_seasons    = 1
 | num_episodes   = 13
 | picture_format = 480i (SDTV),  1080i (HDTV)
}}After Hours is a Singaporean drama produced by local TV station MediaCorp. It was broadcast on Mondays at 11:00pm.

Premise
Screen couple Utt and Linda Liao reprised their roles as Gabriel and Ellie from Chase for the show, joined by Joanne Peh and Max Loong as April and Danny. The show starts six months after Chase ends, where Gabriel and Ellie go on holiday together.

April and Ellie are former classmates, now friends. Danny is an old friend of Gabriel, although they lost contact previously. Danny spent some time in the United States, but has returned to Singapore for good. The four of them become good friends and spend time together regularly.

Cast
Linda Liao as Ellie Chua
Utt Panichkul as Gabriel Peh
Max Loong as Danny Mereles
Joanne Peh as April Tay

Synopsis
At the end of Chase, Gabriel and Ellie went on holiday together. They came back and have been together ever since. Gabriel worked on a huge Breast Cancer Awareness campaign that Lauren Lee (his boss from Mad About Ads) managed to win just as the ad agency was on the brink of closing down.

After the campaign, Lauren finally decided to close Mad About Ads and went to work for the Singapore Breast Cancer Foundation as its head of publicity. David (Gabriel's best friend from Chase) got a good advertising job in Sydney, and moved there. Dora, Gabriel's mother, gave birth and decided to settle down with her pilot husband Uncle John (they married at the end of Chase) in his hometown in Kuala Lumpur. Occasionally, she traveled with him on his overseas flights.

Uncle Rob sold his house and retired to Bintan. Ellie is now staying at one of Uncle Rob's many investments – an apartment downtown. Gabriel starts his own ad agency, Angel Advertising, essentially just Gabriel and Danny, the Creative Director, with no office. Gabriel works from home or various cafes, while Danny does not work much but has a lot of contacts. Gabriel keeps him around because he is cheap. By the start of Season 2, Gabriel has a small but loyal group of clients.

At the end of Chase'', Ellie had been forced to close down the vet clinic after a takeover by one of Uncle Rob's friends. When she returned from the vacation with Gabriel, she tried to start up a pet food store. The store ran for about six months, and then closed down when the capital ran out. She is now an Aunt Aggie for pet owners, writing for a pet magazine, MyPet Monthly, while hoping to save some money to open her own pet store chain.

April works as a personal trainer, so Ellie and April often meet at the gym. Danny tries to get free gym sessions from April in order to meet women.

Episodes

References

External links
Official Channel 5 Website
MOBTV Website

Singaporean television series
2007 Singaporean television series debuts
2007 Singaporean television series endings
Channel 5 (Singapore) original programming